Heibei Okamura (1852–1934) produced Japan's finest "Okamura's" chaulmoogra oil,, between about 1892 and 1944 at Sakai, Osaka, Japan. Chaulmoogra oil, which is taken from capsular fruits of Hydnocarpus genus trees of Thailand, Indonesia, Malaysia and the Philippines, had been the only one remedy in wide use before Guy Henry Faget proved the efficacy of promin in 1943 Promin started the era of sulfon chemicals and revolutionalized the treatment of leprosy. Okamura was also known for caring for more than 1,000 leprosy patients between 1888 and 1901 in his house.

Life
Heibei Okamura was born in Osaka in 1852, and his father went into the Okamura family. He married a girl of the Okamura family named Koteru. He was known in his city, Sakai, Osaka for being an amateur sumo wrestler, a tall height of 188 cm and for being a Japanese sword master. In 1888, he happened to save a miserable person with leprosy; he gave the patient a wash in a bathtub. Between 1888 and 1901, he cared for more than 1,000 leprosy patients in his house. He studied Chinese medicine and began to produce chaulmoogra oil probably in 1892, which was the year of the first advertisement. In 1944, the import of the materials of the oil discontinued, and the chaulmoogra oil age came to an end.

Clove oil
The Okamura family had the technique of oil production, and since 1672, clove oil had been produced in the Okamura family. Clove oil had a variety of uses from Chinese medicine to the keeping of Japanese swords in good condition. Since the Meiji Restoration, the popularity of clove oil decreased, and the production of chaulmoogra oil was a prospective venture.

Chaulmoogra oil
In a medical journal published in 1892, the first advertisement of Okamura's chaulmoogra oil was found. It was registered in Japanese Pharmacopoeia. Chaulmoogra oil was produced later by Ministry of Welfare, but the quality of the oil was inferior to Okamura's oil. 
The efficacy of chaulmoogra oil for leprosy was studied in a special lecture in 1940 by Yutaka Kamikawa; it differed depending on sanatoriums from 30% to 80%  and there were many recurrences. However, before promin was discovered in 1943 by Guy Henry Faget, chaulmoogra oil had been the only remedy known to be effective in this disease.

References
Chaulmoogra oil and Heibei Okamura(1986) Sakuma H. Nihon Iji Shimpo 3239
治らい剤「大風子油」と十九世瑞碩岡村平兵衛(1986)　佐久間温巳、日本医事新報　3239号　
A visit to Okamura family (1937) Miyagawa H. Aisei Vol.6, Num. 7.
泉州堺岡村家訪問記(1937) 宮川量　「愛生」第6巻7号

Footnotes

Leprosy nurses and caregivers
1852 births
1934 deaths
Japanese leprologists